Dalton Piercy is a village and civil parish in the borough of Hartlepool, County Durham, in England. The population of the civil parish taken at the 2011 Cernsus was 289.

Location
Dalton Piercy is situated 1 mile east of the A19 and 1 mile to the west of Hartlepool. It is situated just north of industrialised Teesside. The village has a village hall but no shops. Most of the houses are built around a central village green, with some modern cul-de-sacs to the west of the village.

Governance
In May 2021, the parish council, alongside the parish councils of the villages of Elwick, Hart, and Greatham all issued individual votes of no confidence in Hartlepool Borough Council, and expressed their desire to re-join County Durham.

References

External links

Villages in County Durham
Borough of Hartlepool
Places in the Tees Valley